Skidoo (formerly, Hoveck) was an unincorporated community in Inyo County, California. The geographical location of the old town site lies at an elevation of 5,689 feet (1734 m). Skidoo is a ghost town located in Death Valley National Park. It is on the National Register of Historic Places.

History
Skidoo is representative of the boom towns that flourished in Death Valley during the early 20th century. The town's livelihood depended primarily on the output of the Skidoo Mine, a venture operating between 1906 and 1917. During those years the mine produced about 75,000 ounces of gold, worth at the time more than $1.5 million. Two unique items are associated with Skidoo's mining heyday. First the town possessed the only milling plant in the desert operated almost completely by water power. Second, the construction of the water pipeline was a phenomenal engineering feat; its scar can still be seen between its origin near Telescope Peak and the mill site.

The fifteen-stamp amalgamation and cyanide mill built by the Skidoo Mines Company is a rare surviving example of an early 20th-century gravity-feed system for separating gold from its ore.

Names
The name Skidoo comes from the expression 23 skidoo, a slang expression of the time, for which various origins have been suggested.

The Hoveck post office opened in 1906, changed its name to Skidoo in 1907, and closed in 1917. The name Hoveck honored Matt Hoveck, manager of the Skidoo Mine.

See also
List of ghost towns in California

References

External links 

National Park Service: Death Valley Ghost Towns
Skidoo, Calidornia at Western Mining History

Ghost towns in Inyo County, California
Mining communities in California
Populated places in the Mojave Desert
Historic districts on the National Register of Historic Places in California
Former settlements in Inyo County, California
Historic American Engineering Record in California
National Register of Historic Places in Inyo County, California
National Register of Historic Places in Death Valley National Park
Populated places on the National Register of Historic Places in California